The 2022 Fiesta Bowl was a college football bowl game that was played on December 31, 2022, at State Farm Stadium in Glendale, Arizona. The 52nd annual Fiesta Bowl and one of the two College Football Playoff (CFP) semifinals, the game featured two of the four teams selected by the College Football Playoff Selection Committee—TCU from the Big 12 Conference and Michigan from the Big Ten Conference.  In the highest scoring Fiesta Bowl, and second-highest scoring CFP semifinal game, TCU won, 51–45. They advanced to face the winner of the Peach Bowl, Georgia, in the 2023 College Football National Championship, which is at SoFi Stadium in Inglewood, CA, on January 9, 2023. The game began at 2:11p.m. MST and was aired on ESPN. It was one of the 2022–23 bowl games concluding the 2022 FBS football season. Sponsored by vacation rental marketplace Vrbo, the game was officially known as the College Football Playoff Semifinal at the Vrbo Fiesta Bowl.

College Football Playoff

Teams
The game featured the Michigan Wolverines, champions of the Big Ten Conference, playing against the Big 12 Conference runner-up TCU Horned Frogs. This was the first meeting between the teams.

The Horned Frogs entered the CFP after facing the longest odds of any team to ever do so at 200–1, and entered this game as underdogs by 7.5 points.

TCU

The TCU Horned Frogs, under the leadership of first-year head coach Sonny Dykes, finished the regular season with an unblemished 12–0 record and finished Big 12 play similarly at 9–0. That record put them atop the Big 12 and into the conference championship game, where they fell to Kansas State in an upset that knocked them to 12–1. It did not impact their No. 3 ranking, as they were selected to that spot in the College Football Playoff (CFP); this is their first CFP appearance and the first appearance by a team from the state of Texas. This is the TCU's first Fiesta Bowl appearance since 2010, when they lost to Boise State.

TCU quarterback Max Duggan, who entered the year as the Horned Frogs' backup, led their offense to a successful year in which they averaged over 40 points per game and nearly seven yards per play. Duggan, who finished second in Heisman Trophy voting, enters the game having completed 64.9% of his passes, leading the nation, and sporting a ratio of 30 passing touchdowns to four interceptions. TCU's defense earned praise from analysts as well as cornerbacks Josh Newton and Tre'Vius Hodges-Tomlinson led the team to the second-best pass efficiency defense in the Big 12. Previews cited TCU's positive results in one-score games, five wins and no losses, as a reason that they might have the edge should the game remain close late.

Michigan

Jim Harbaugh's Michigan team finished the regular season with a perfect 12–0 record and went 9–0 in Big Ten Conference matchups, including a second-straight victory against Ohio State, and earned the first 13-win season in Michigan program history with a win over Purdue in the conference championship. This is Michigan's second consecutive appearance in the CFP. It is also Michigan's first appearance in the Fiesta Bowl since 1986, where the Wolverines, led by Harbaugh as quarterback, defeated Nebraska by a 27–23 score. The game will be Michigan's 50th bowl game appearance, and they enter with a 21–28 record in prior appearances.

The Michigan rushing offense was cited by analysts as a strong point, even after the Wolverines lost running back Blake Corum during their regular season game against Illinois. Donovan Edwards stepped up to take his place and has put up over 800 yards and seven touchdowns in his time as the Wolverines' starter, and will play behind the Michigan offensive line that won the Joe Moore Award as college football's best offensive line unit. Michigan quarterback J. J. McCarthy will enter the game ranking second in the Big Ten in quarterback rating, and he will have Ronnie Bell and Cornelius Johnson, the Wolverines' two leading receivers by total receptions, to aid in the passing attack.

Broadcast
The Fiesta Bowl was televised by ESPN, with a commentary team of Sean McDonough on play-by-play, Todd Blackledge providing analysis, and Molly McGrath and Tiffany Blackmon on the Michigan and TCU sidelines, respectively. The ESPN Radio broadcast was commentated by Marc Kestecher, Kelly Stouffer, and Ian Fitzsimmons.

ESPN aired its MegaCast coverage for both College Football Playoff semifinals and the National Championship Game; the primary telecast aired on ESPN while other channels in the ESPN family of networks aired alternate broadcasts. ESPN2 aired"Field Pass" with The Pat McAfee Show, which featured Pat McAfee along with Robert Griffin III, Taylor Lewan, and A. Q. Shipley, among others. Audio from the main telecast was played on both ESPNU, which aired Command Center, and ESPNews, which aired the SkyCast (a continuous feed from the skycam). The All-22 broadcast, on the ESPN app, was paired with audio from the ESPN Radio broadcast. The hometown radio broadcasts from each team was shown on the ESPN app as well; TCU's radio broadcast featured commentators Brian Estridge, John Denton, and Landry Burdine, while Michigan's featured a call from Doug Karsch, Jon Jansen, and Jason Avant. ESPN Deportes carried the Spanish language-broadcast, featuring Ciro Procuna, Ramiro Pruneda and Carlos Nava.

Game summary
The game's officiating crew, representing the Southeastern Conference, will be led by referee Jason Autrey and umpire Brent Sowell. The game will be played indoors at State Farm Stadium in Glendale, Arizona.

First half
Michigan got the ball to begin the game from Luke Laminack's opening kickoff. On their first play from scrimmage, running back Donovan Edwards carried the ball for a 54-yard gain to reach the TCU 21-yard-line; he ran again two plays later for 3 yards to enter the red zone on Michigan's third play. J. J. McCarthy passed to Roman Wilson for 9 yards on the next play, which converted 3rd & 7. After a false start penalty set them back to the TCU 11-yard-line, McCarthy scrambled for a gain of 5 to bring up 4th & Goal from the TCU 2-yard-line. Michigan attempted to go for it but was unsuccessful as Colston Loveland was tackled for a loss of 8 yards, giving TCU the ball at the Michigan 10-yard-line. TCU was unable to take advantage as Max Duggan threw an incomplete pass on their first play of the game and TCU ended up punting after a three-and-out despite an 8-yard rush by Kendre Miller during the series. The kick was downed at the Michigan 34-yard-line, though TCU's defense scored the first points of the game after Bud Clark intercepted a McCarthy pass on the first play of the drive and returned it 41 yards for a touchdown. Placekicker Griffin Kell added the extra point to make the score 7–0. Michigan's next drive went only slightly better as Edwards rushed twice for a total of six yards on their first two plays and McCarthy's pass intended for Cornelius Johnson on third down was incomplete, leading Brad Robbins to punt for the Wolverines for the first time. TCU took over at their own 24-yard-line and began well with a 14-yard Miller rush to earn a first down; Duggan carried it himself for a 12-yard gain several plays later to earn a first down on 3rd & 7. A 21-yard pass from Duggan to Jordan Hudson followed on the next play, and he found Derius Davis on their next third down to reach the Michigan 11-yard-line. From there, Duggan rushed three times and gained 3, 1, and 2 yards, the last of which reached the end zone for a touchdown. Laminack's ensuing kickoff went out for a touchback and the Wolverines offense recovered from a loss of 5 yards on their first play with a 32-yard pass from McCarthy to Luke Schoonmaker to enter TCU territory. McCarthy found Loveland two plays later for a gain of 16 yards, and Edwards got the carry for 5 yards on the next play, which ended the first quarter.

Michigan started the second quarter with a 2nd & 5 from the TCU 24-yard-line, and were unable to pick up the required yardage on their next two plays. Jake Moody was brought on to attempt a 42-yard field goal, which he made. Michigan's defense came up with a big play shortly afterwards as Duggan's pass was intercepted by Rod Moore at the Michigan 49-yard-line on TCU's next play. Michigan completed a long pass from McCarthy to Wilson for 50 yards, reaching the TCU 1-yard-line, but a fumble on the next play by Kalel Mullings gave the ball back to the Horned Frogs at their own 20-yard-line after a touchback. Miller rushed for 13 yards to open TCU's next series but two incomplete passes stalled the drive and forced a punt by Jordy Sandy on 4th & 4, which was returned by A. J. Henning to the Michigan 26-yard-line. Michigan also earned a first down early in their next series with an 8-yard McCarthy-to-Edwards pass picking up the yardage, but a loss of two yards on second down and an incomplete pass forced Michigan to bring on Robbins for a punt of their own, which was fair caught by Davis at the TCU 17-yard-line. Duggan completed a pass to Hudson for a gain of 13 yards and rushed for 8 yards on two consecutive plays to nearly reach midfield, and a 32-yard pass on the next play to Quentin Johnston got them inside the red zone. After a 9-yard rush by Miller, Duggan passed to Taye Barber for a 6-yard touchdown to extend TCU's lead to 18 points. McCarthy got Michigan's next drive off to a good start with a 14-yard completion to Loveland, and their drive was extended by a roughing the passer penalty that moved the ball to the TCU 39-yard-line. A false start set them back and a sack by Dylan Horton for a loss of 7 yards put Michigan in a hole and they had to punt on 4th & 20. TCU began their final possession of the first half with 1:20 remaining at their own 15-yard-line, though a 16-yard Emari Demercado rush got them started quickly. A sack by Makari Paige pushed the Horned Frogs back 7 yards several plays later and forced a Sandy punt, which was fair caught at the Michigan 33-yard-line with 47 seconds remaining. The Wolverines reached midfield with a 15-yard pass to Johnson but lost yardage on a strip sack by Horton; the ball was recovered by the Wolverines for a loss of 11 yards. After a pass interference penalty called against Tre'Vius Hodges-Tomlinson moved the ball to the TCU 41-yard-line, Jake Moody made a 59-yard field goal as time expired to narrow Michigan's deficit to 15 points going into halftime.

Second half
TCU got the ball first to begin the second half and picked up 14 yards on their first play as Duggan rushed for a first down. They were unable to capitalize off of their strong start, as they gained one yard on their next three plays and punted. Michigan, who gained fifteen yards following a kick catch interference penalty on the punt, started their drive on their own 33-yard-line and lost 2 yards on their first play before McCarthy passed for 20 yards to Wilson and 43 yards to Ronnie Bell to reach the TCU 6-yard-line. After a 3-yard rush by Edwards and a rush for no gain by Mullings, McCarthy's pass to Bell lost one yard and set up a 21-yard field goal for Moody, making the score 21–9 in favor of TCU. Duggan began TCU's first series of the second half with a 6-yard pass to Jared Wiley and Demercado rushed for five yards on two carries afterwards, earning a first down. After two incomplete passes, Duggan passed downfield but was intercepted by Mike Sainristil, who returned the ball to the TCU 45-yard-line to set up Michigan's next possession. Edwards rushed twice, gaining 3 and 8 yards, before McCarthy threw a 34-yard touchdown pass to Bell. Moody made the extra point, bringing Michigan within five points. TCU's next drive started with a 46-yard pass from Duggan to Johnston, which reached the Michigan 29-yard-line, and Demercado rushed on the next five plays, gaining 28 yards on the first four carries before a 1-yard touchdown rush moved TCU's lead back to twelve points. Laminack's kickoff was returned by Henning to the Michigan 21-yard-line and McCarthy passed to Bell for 8 yards; two plays later, McCarthy's pass was intercepted by Dee Winters and returned for a touchdown for TCU's second pick-six of the game. An issue with the snap on the extra point forced the Horned Frogs to attempt to run the ball in for a two-point conversion, which they failed. Michigan struck back quickly, as they moved to their own 41-yard-line with a defensive holding penalty called against Josh Newton on their second play and advanced into the red zone with a 39-yard rush by McCarthy. He kept the ball again on Michigan's next play, scoring on a 20-yard rushing touchdown to bring Michigan back within 12 points; the Wolverines attempted a rushing two-point conversion but were unsuccessful. The high-scoring third quarter continues on TCU's next drive as Demercado rushed for 8 yards on the Horned Frogs' first play before breaking off a 69-yard rush before he was brought down at the Michigan 1-yard-line. Duggan punched it in for a 1-yard touchdown on the next play, reestablishing a 19-point lead for his team. Michigan made good use of this time with a 20-yard pass from McCarthy to Wilson on their first play and a 44-yard pass to Bell following a holding penalty on TCU's Millard Bradford; Mullings scored a touchdown on a 1-yard rush with three seconds remaining on Michigan's next play. The Wolverines opted to attempt another two-point conversion, and McCarthy kept the ball this time and scored on a rush, narrowing the deficit to eleven points. TCU took back possession on their own 25-yard-line and ran the ball on a handoff to Demercado on their first play, but a fumble gave the ball right back to Michigan on the TCU 27-yard-line to end the third quarter.

The Michigan offense was quick to take advantage of the TCU miscue as Edwards rushed for 9 yards to set up an 18-yard touchdown rush by Wilson; that was followed by a two-point pass from McCarthy to Bell that brought the Wolverines within three points of the Horned Frogs. TCU faced a third down early in their next drive after Demercado rushed for 3 yards and Duggan's pass to Hudson was incomplete, but they converted and more with a 76-yard touchdown pass from Duggan to Johnston. Kell's extra point bumped their lead back up to ten points. Michigan began their next drive at their own 13-yard-line following an illegal block penalty on the kickoff return. A sack of McCarthy by Horton in addition to an intentional grounding penalty on second down lost Michigan 12 yards, and an incomplete pass on the next play forced a Michigan punt, which was returned by Davis to the Michigan 16-yard-line. The Horned Frogs were not able to take full advantage of their field position as they gained a net total of one yard on their first three plays and settled for a field goal attempt, which Kell converted from 33 yards. Michigan went three-and-out on their next drive, as McCarthy threw two incomplete passes on their first two plays before he rushed for a gain of 1 yard, which brought up 4th & 9. Robbins's punt went for 64 yards and was downed at the TCU 10-yard-line, though the Horned Frogs' drive ended similarly after they gained six yards in three plays; the punt was fair caught at the Michigan 44-yard-line. McCarthy completed a pass to Johnson for a 15-yard gain on Michigan's first play, and a pass interference against Hodges-Tomlinson on their next play moved them to the TCU 26-yard-line. They reached the red zone on the next play with an Edwards rush, and another rush plus a Bell reception moved them inside the 10-yard-line. They converted 3rd & 5 from that spot two plays later, and McCarthy passed to Wilson for a 5-yard touchdown to conclude the drive, narrowing their deficit to six points. TCU got the ball back at their own 10-yard-line with three minutes remaining, and they took three plays to earn a first down with three rushes. Demercado and Duggan rushed once each and Duggan completed a pass to Johnston to expend all of Michigan's timeouts, but they ended up one yard short of the line to gain and had to punt. Michigan got possession at their own 25-yard-line with 45 seconds remaining, and McCarthy rushed for 5 yards on their first play, but two incomplete passes and a delay of game penalty brought up 4th & 10 with 25 seconds remaining. On their final play, McCarthy got the snap before he was expecting it and the play ended in a loss of one yard, giving the ball back to TCU on downs. TCU took a knee to run out the clock and win the game, 51–45, and advance to the national championship game.

Scoring summary

Statistics

References

Fiesta Bowl
Fiesta Bowl
Fiesta Bowl
Michigan Wolverines football bowl games
TCU Horned Frogs football bowl games
Fiesta Bowl
Fiesta Bowl